Peabody Hall may refer to:

Peabody Hall (University of Arkansas), in the University of Arkansas Campus Historic District
Peabody Hall (Gainesville, Florida), at the University of Florida
Peabody Hall (University of Mississippi), listed as a one of Mississippi's Landmarks
Peabody Hall (Miami University, Ohio)

Architectural disambiguation pages